The 2022 Busch Light Clash at The Coliseum was a NASCAR Cup Series race that was held on February 6, 2022, at Los Angeles Memorial Coliseum in Los Angeles, California. Contested over 150 laps, it was the first exhibition race of the 2022 NASCAR Cup Series season.

Format and eligibility

On September 14, 2021, NASCAR announced that the Busch Clash will move to the Los Angeles Memorial Coliseum. On November 9, 2021, the format for the 2022 Clash was announced:

 The event is open for all teams and drivers for the first time in its history.
 A total of 350 laps in six races.
 The 36 charter teams and up to four open teams will participate in qualifying. Should more than 40 teams enter the race, it is unknown if qualifying will determine who advances to heat races.
 Based on lap times, cars are put in one of four heat races of 25 laps each. The top four drivers in each heat advance to the feature.
 All non qualifying drivers are assigned to one of two 50 lap heat races. The top three drivers in each heat advance to the feature.
 The highest driver in 2021 Cup Series points standings not in will also advance to the feature in the last position.
 The feature is 150 laps and will have 23 cars start the race.

Entry list 
 (R) denotes rookie driver.
 (i) denotes driver who are ineligible for series driver points.

Practice
Chase Elliott was the fastest in the practice session with a time of 13.455 with an average speed of 
.

Practice results

Qualifying

Qualifying results

Qualifying heat races
Kyle Busch scored the pole for the race after winning the first qualifying heat race. Ty Dillon finished first in the second "Last Chance" qualifying race, however was disqualified for a restart violation, allowing Harrison Burton to qualify for the feature.

Race 1

Race 2

Race 3

Race 4

Last Chance Qualifier 1

Last Chance Qualifier 2

Starting lineup

Race

Race results

Media
Fox covered the race on the television side. Mike Joy, Clint Bowyer, and three-time NASCAR Cup Series champion and co-owner of Stewart-Haas Racing Tony Stewart handled the call in the booth for the race, while pit reporters Jamie Little and Regan Smith as well as Larry McReynolds handled interviews. Chris Myers and Jamie McMurray were the host and analyst in the studio.

Television

Radio

Television Ratings 
The Clash was viewed by more than 4.2 million people, which earned it a 2.32 rating. The ratings were only eclipsed by the 2022 Winter Olympics on NBC, which had 10.1 million viewers. Locally, the race earned a 2.7 and was the highest rated non-Daytona 500 race in the Los Angeles market in six years. This was the highest rated Clash since 2016, which was the last year it was aired on FOX.

The heat races that preceded the race had nearly 2.6 million viewers.

Notes

References

Busch Light Clash at The Coliseum
Busch Light Clash at The Coliseum
Busch Light Clash at The Coliseum
NASCAR races at Los Angeles Memorial Coliseum